In enzymology, Nα-benzyloxycarbonylleucine hydrolase is an enzyme that catalyzes the chemical reaction

Nα-benzyloxycarbonyl-L-leucine + H2O  benzyl alcohol + CO2 + L-leucine

Thus, the two substrates of this enzyme are Nα-benzyloxycarbonyl-L-leucine and H2O, whereas its three products are benzyl alcohol, CO2, and L-leucine.

This enzyme belongs to the family of hydrolases, those acting on carbon-nitrogen bonds other than peptide bonds, specifically in linear amides.  The systematic name of this enzyme class is Nalpha-benzyloxycarbonyl-L-leucine urethanehydrolase. Other names in common use include benzyloxycarbonylleucine hydrolase, Nalpha-benzyloxycarbonyl amino acid urethane hydrolase IV, and alpha-N-benzyloxycarbonyl-L-leucine urethanehydrolase.

References

 

EC 3.5.1
Enzymes of unknown structure